Zangezur is  a historical and geographical region in Eastern Armenia.  Zangezur may also refer to:

Places
 Zangezur uezd, an historical administrative unit of the Elizavetpol Governorate of the Russian Empire
 East Zangezur Economic Region, an administrative division of Azerbaijan

Other uses
 Zangezur (film), a 1938 Soviet Armenian film

See also